Chris Johnson is an American politician from Maine. He was a member of the Maine Senate. A Democrat, Johnson won a special election to replace David Trahan, who had resigned to work as a lobbyist. In 2010, Johnson lost to Trahan with 32% of the vote. He won election to his first full term in November 2012 by 171 votes over Republican State Representative Les Fossel. He is a resident of Somerville, Maine and a graduate of Bangor High School and the University of Maine.

Johnson is the Director of Information Technology at a technology company in Portland, Maine.

In the 2016 election, Johnson lost his seat to Republican challenger Dana Dow, who had previously served in the Maine Senate from 2004 to 2008.

References

Year of birth missing (living people)
Living people
People from Lincoln County, Maine
Politicians from Bangor, Maine
University of Maine alumni
American computer specialists
Democratic Party Maine state senators
21st-century American politicians